Kamari (also Romanized as Kamarī and Kamri; also known as Kamanī) is a village in Tork-e Gharbi Rural District, Jowkar District, Malayer County, Hamadan Province, Iran. At the 2006 census, its population was 2,389, in 481 families.

References 

Populated places in Malayer County